Jessica Novak is an American drama television series that aired on CBS from November 5 until December 3, 1981 and was written by Ira Steven Behr. The cast includes Helen Shaver, Kip Gilman, Erik Kilpatrick, and Lara Parker. The series was cancelled after only 7 episodes and the last two episodes were only aired in West Germany.

Synopsis
The series focused on Jessica Novak, a news reporter for KLA-TV, who did human interest stories and exposes.

Cast
 Helen Shaver as Jessica Novak
 David Spielberg as Max Kenyon
 Andrew Rubin as Phil Bonelli
 Eric Kilpatrick as Ricky Duran
 Nina Wilcox as Audrey Stiles
 Kenneth Gilman as Vince Halloran
 Lara Parker as Katie Roberts

Episodes

References

External links

1980s American drama television series
1981 American television series debuts
1981 American television series endings
Television series by 20th Century Fox Television
CBS original programming
Television shows set in Los Angeles
English-language television shows
Television series about journalism